Riga Aviation Museum is an aviation museum in Riga, Latvia.

Location and history

The museum was located on the grounds of Riga International Airport and is regularly open for public viewing. Its Latvian name is Rīgas aviācijas muzejs. It was established in 1956 by Victor Talpa, who worked for the Latvian Civil Aviation Administration, but it was privatised in 1997. In 2022, the entire museum was moved to Skulte. The new location is also right next to the airport.

Exhibits

Some of the aircraft and helicopters at the museum are:

 Aero L-29 Delfin
 Antonov An-2
 Antonov An-24
 Mikoyan-Gurevich MiG-15
 Mikoyan-Gurevich MiG-21
 Mikoyan-Gurevich MiG-23
 Mikoyan-Gurevich MiG-25RBS (Foxbat-D)
 Mikoyan MiG-27
 Mikoyan MiG-29 
 Mil Mi-2
 Mil Mi-4
 Mil Mi-6 
 Mil Mi-8
 Mil Mi-24 
 Sukhoi Su-7
 Sukhoi Su-15
 Sukhoi Su-22
 Yakovlev Yak-28R 
 Tupolev Tu-22M1
 Tupolev Tu-134
 Zlín Z-37A

Most of the museum's aircraft collection is displayed outdoors, and therefore exposed to the elements.

See also
Spilve Airport
List of aviation museums

References

Bibliography

External links

Official site

Museums in Riga
Aerospace museums
Museums established in 1956
Transport museums in Latvia
1956 establishments in Latvia